21st Century Union March is an album by Ethnic Heritage Ensemble, a jazz band formed by percussionist Kahil El'Zabar, who is joined by saxophonist Edward Wilkerson and trombonist Joseph Bowie. It was recorded in 1995 and released on the Swedish Silkheart label.

Reception

In his review for AllMusic, Thom Jurek describes the album as:

The Penguin Guide to Jazz states:

In a review for JazzTimes Willard Jenkins says:

Track listing
All compositions by Kahil El'Zabar except as indicated
 "Crumb Puck You Let Slide" – 6:48
 "Fanfare" – 8:58
 "Lover Man" (Jimmy Davis, Roger 'Ram' Ramirez, James Sherman) – 3:23
 "How the Cow See Cirrus" – 11:43
 "Missing Miles" (Joseph Bowie) – 5:03
 "Burundi" – 10:05
 "Love Outside of Dreams" – 6:27
 "Dear Albert" – 9:01
 "Procession" – 3:14

Personnel
Joseph Bowie – trombone, miscellaneous percussion
Edward Wilkerson – tenor sax, alto clarinet, miscellaneous percussion
Kahil El'Zabar – earth drums, sansa, trap drums, miscellaneous percussion, vocals

References

Sources

1997 albums
Kahil El'Zabar albums
Silkheart Records albums